The Church of St Andrew in Chew Magna, Somerset, England dates from the 12th century with a large 15th-century pinnacled sandstone tower, a Norman font and a rood screen that is the full width of the church. It is a Grade I listed building.

History

The church was restored in 1860 and has a register commencing in 1562. The tower is about one hundred feet tall and was probably built about 1440.
There has been a clock on the tower since the early 18th century. There is a peal of eight bells in the tower. Tenor 28 cwt in C. The original five bells were re-cast by the celebrated Thomas Bilbie of Chew Stoke in 1735 to make a peal of six, and in 1898 four of these were re-cast and two were repaired by Messrs. Mears and Stainbank of London to commemorate the Diamond Jubilee of Queen Victoria. Two additional bells, the gift of Brigadier Ommanney, were added in 1928 to complete the octave, which still contains two of the Bilbie bells. The present clock, installed in 1903, plays a verse of a hymn every four hours, at 8 am, noon, 4 and 8 pm, with a different hymn tune for every day of the week.

It is next to Chew Court which was originally a palace for Gisa the Bishop of Bath and Wells,

Thomas Minor was baptized in St. Andrew's in 1608. A modern plaque is mounted on St. Andrew's wall to commemorate the events  He then migrated to America in 1629, becoming one of the founders of Stonington, CT.  The Thomas Minor Society documents his history and genealogy.

The church is within the joint benefice with the Church of St Michael, Dundry and Holy Trinity Church, Norton Malreward.

Churchyard

The churchyard contains several monuments which are Grade II listed buildings in their own right: the churchyard cross,
Edgell monument,
Fowler monument
and a group of three unidentified monuments. In addition there is an early 19th-century limestone round-topped stone which bears the inscription to William Fowler "shot by an Highwayman on
Dundry Hill June 14th 1814 aged 32 years", and Commonwealth war grave of a Royal Air Force officer of World War II.

Interior memorials

Within the church are wooden plaques commemorating the nineteen people from the village who died in World War I
and seven from World War II,
and a bronze plaque to an individual soldier who died in 1917.

In the church are several memorials to the Stracheys of Sutton Court together with a wooden effigy of a Knight cross-legged and leaning on one elbow, in 15th-century armour, thought to be of Sir John de Hauteville or a descendant, and possibly transferred from a church at Norton Hautville before it was demolished.
The church also houses the final resting place of Sir Edward Baber (1530-1578) son of Sir John Baber. He was Sergeant at Law and husband to Lady Catherine Leigh-Baber, the daughter of Sir Thomas Leigh, Lord Mayor of London under Queen Elizabeth I.

See also
 List of Grade I listed buildings in Bath and North East Somerset
 List of towers in Somerset
 List of ecclesiastical parishes in the Diocese of Bath and Wells

References

12th-century church buildings in England
Church of England church buildings in Bath and North East Somerset
Grade I listed churches in Somerset
Grade I listed buildings in Bath and North East Somerset